The Hăuzeasca is a left tributary of the river Gladna in Romania. It flows into the Gladna in Fârdea.

References

Rivers of Romania
Rivers of Timiș County